Abdellatif Jrindou (Arabic: عبد اللطيف جريندو) (born 1 October 1974) is a retired Moroccan football Defender.

In his career, Jrindou played for Olympique Casablanca in Morocco, Al-Ahli in UAE, Al-Ittifaq in Saudi Arabia and Raja Casablanca.

Jrindou has made several appearances for the Morocco national football team.

He is currently the manager of Moghreb Atletico Tetouan.

References 

1974 births
Living people
Moroccan footballers
Morocco international footballers
1998 African Cup of Nations players
Raja CA players
Al Ahli Club (Dubai) players
Ettifaq FC players
Association football defenders
Moroccan expatriate footballers
Expatriate footballers in the United Arab Emirates
Expatriate footballers in Saudi Arabia
Moroccan expatriate sportspeople in Saudi Arabia
Moroccan expatriate sportspeople in the United Arab Emirates
UAE Pro League players
Saudi Professional League players
Botola players